The key implementation technique of GenVoca is due to Smaragdakis called mixin-layers.

Aspectual mixin layers and aspectual feature modules are recent extensions that incorporate aspect-oriented programming.

See also 
Feature-oriented programming

References 

Software design